is a 2015 side-scrolling platform game and game creation system developed and published by Nintendo for the Wii U, released worldwide in September 2015. Players can create, play, and share courses online, free of charge, based on the styles of Super Mario Bros., Super Mario Bros. 3, Super Mario World, and New Super Mario Bros. U. The game was revealed as the final challenge of Nintendo World Championships 2015.

Upon release, critical reviews praised its user interface and course editing tools. By May 2016, more than seven million courses had been created by players worldwide, which had been played more than 600 million times.  was released in December 2016. Super Mario Maker 2 was released for the Nintendo Switch in June 2019. On November 25, 2020, Nintendo formally announced that course upload support would be discontinued on March 31, 2021 and that sale of the game on the Wii U's Nintendo eShop would be discontinued on January 12, 2021. The Super Mario Maker bookmark portal site was discontinued on January 13, 2021.

Gameplay

Super Mario Maker allows players to create levels in the style of the Super Mario series, and publish them to the Internet for other players. The courses are based on the gameplay and visual style of Super Mario Bros., Super Mario Bros. 3, Super Mario World, and New Super Mario Bros. U, which all share the physics of the latter. The gameplay mechanics and enemy behavior vary between game modes. Some elements are limited to specific game styles, and other elements can be merged into other game styles, such as having Boos in Super Mario Bros.

In addition to traditional Mario elements such as Goombas, warp pipes, and power ups, players can uniquely manipulate the behavior of elements. For example, enemies can be stacked, hazards can emerge from question blocks and warp pipes, shells can be worn as protective helmets, and cannons can emit chosen objects. These new combinations are enabled by editing tools working in tandem. Players can enlarge an enemy with a Super Mushroom, give an enemy a pair of flying wings, combine different attributes, and more. The Soundfrog adds audiovisual effects, though microphone-recorded sounds are removed from uploaded courses. New editing elements are unlocked gradually across nine days of course creation. The Mystery Mushroom, exclusive to the Super Mario Bros. theme, has the power-up of a Super Mushroom and dresses Mario in one of about 150 costumes. Each of these costumes can be unlocked by playing through the 100 Mario Challenge, by clearing special Event Courses, or by scanning a corresponding Amiibo figurine. The 8-bit Mario figurine adds a Big Mushroom that makes Mario giant while making enemies look like Mario, with hats and mustaches.

After a created course is played to completion, it is then allowed to be published to the online Course World. There, all players can browse and play various user-generated courses, or participate in the 100 Mario Challenge with a set of randomly selected user-created courses with 100 lives. Alternatively, players can play the 10 Mario Challenge, with a selection of pre-made courses and only 10 lives. Players are initially limited in the number of uploadable courses, but by receiving stars from other players, they can earn medals which allow them to upload more courses.

Development
Before developing Super Mario Maker, Nintendo had previously explored the concept of a video game editor in the 1990s. The company filed a patent in 1994, for console hardware allowing players to pause a game, edit parts of the game, resume gameplay, and to save and share the changes. Super Mario Maker was conceived as a tool for Nintendo's internal development team to make Mario levels. The team, however, quickly realized the tool's potential as a standalone game and pitched the idea to senior game designer Takashi Tezuka. Meanwhile, Tezuka had been wanting to make a Wii U follow-up to Mario Paint that utilizes the Wii U GamePad. Upon seeing the Super Mario Maker tool, Tezuka realized that a course-making tool was more marketable than a mere art program. He noted to Polygon that building courses is "not as difficult or out of reach as drawing is" but that he "was inspired to bring the fun of Mario Paint into this course editor". This game is the directorial debut of Yosuke Oshino, who previously worked as a programmer on Pikmin, Pikmin 2, and New Super Mario Bros. Wii. The game's soundtrack was composed and arranged by Koji Kondo, Naoto Kubo, and Asuka Hayazaki.

The game was announced at E3 2014 with the title "Mario Maker". Although first revealed officially via Nintendo's E3 Digital Event on June 10, rumors of that title began earlier that month after a photo was taken of Nintendo's incomplete trade show booth which prominently featured the title. The game was rebranded as "Super Mario Maker" at E3 2015 during the Nintendo World Championships.

Marketing and release

Prior to release, Nintendo allowed customers to play Mario Maker at Best Buy stores across North America on June 17 and 20, 2015. It was demonstrated with a new name, Super Mario Maker, on June 14, 2015, during the final round of the Nintendo World Championships event preceding E3 2015. The four courses created by Nintendo Treehouse for the Championships are playable in the final game.

Nintendo partnered with Facebook to host a special "hackathon" event. 150 Facebook employees were tasked with constructing courses using Super Mario Maker, and the winning team created a course to be featured in the game on its launch. Several notable video game designers showcased courses they had created, such as Michel Ancel, Koji Igarashi, Tim Rogers, and Derek Yu. Ancel's course is included in the base game as an Event Course.

Super Mario Maker was released worldwide in September 2015, with a corresponding Wii U bundle. Each copy of the game is packaged with a 96-page booklet of creative ideas, which is also a PDF download. Nintendo concurrently launched an 8-bit Mario Amiibo figurine, in two different color variations. The figurine is packaged alone, and within particular Super Mario Maker game bundles. A downloadable, Super Mario Maker-themed stage for Super Smash Bros. for Nintendo 3DS and Wii U was released on September 30, 2015, and is in the sequel, Super Smash Bros. Ultimate.

The game was originally intended to require players to wait each day to unlock new elements, but a launch day patch delivers new elements corresponding to the player's content creation efforts. Destructoid noted that there were many past Mario series elements missing from the game, but the game was updated with new features. The first major update, released on November 4, 2015, adds mid-course checkpoints, conditional power-ups, and Event Courses. Clearing certain Event Courses unlocks additional Mystery Mushroom costumes, such as Super Mario-kun and GameCenter CX presenter Shinya Arino. The game's second major update was released on December 22, 2015, which adds a speedrun leaderboard, and launched the Super Mario Maker Bookmark website, which allows players to browse uploaded courses and bookmark them to play, allowing for easier sharing of courses. The third update adds more Mystery Mushroom costumes that are unlocked by completing Normal- and Expert-level 100 Mario Challenges, and adds Super Expert mode.

A sequel, Super Mario Maker 2, was announced in a Nintendo Direct on February 13, 2019. It was released for the Nintendo Switch on June 28, 2019, with a new level theme based on the Wii U game Super Mario 3D World, new features including slopes and modifiable auto scroll direction, and new enemies, themes, and items.

On November 25, 2020, Nintendo announced that they were discontinuing support for uploading new courses on March 31, 2021. As a result, the game was removed from the Wii U eShop on January 12, 2021.

Super Mario Maker for Nintendo 3DS
Super Mario Maker for Nintendo 3DS was developed by Redmond-based subsidiary Nintendo Software Technology, with some features adapted or removed. It was released for the Nintendo 3DS in Japan on December 1, 2016, in North America and Europe on December 2, and in Australia on December 3. It includes 100 new built-in courses designed by Nintendo. Players can exchange courses online, directly to friends, or through StreetPass.

Reception

Super Mario Maker received generally favorable reviews. IGN's Jose Otero praised the game's social elements, including its online features and the 10 Mario Challenge, stating that players would "see a genuine reverence for Mario’s history" in the online modes. He praised the course editor and its user interface, writing that "[n]o matter which style you choose, creating levels is an intimidating task but the well designed interface makes learning easy and intuitive" and that it "gives us a fun, flexible toolbox to build and play Mario courses like never before".

GameSpot's Justin Haywald praised the course editor, stating that "the mix-and-match nature [of gameplay elements] allows for exciting and anachronistic additions to familiar scenarios". He was disappointed in particular limitations, such as the absence of checkpoints originating Super Mario World, and the vertical and horizontal limits of stages. He ultimately concluded that "the game won't necessarily turn you into the next Shigeru Miyamoto, but you can almost feel a little bit of that magic rubbing off every time you upload a new creation".

Polygons Griffin McElroy praised the game, saying he had "a tremendous amount of fun playing, but the way it developed that newfound appreciation for something I've known my whole life was the game's biggest accomplishment".

The increasingly rich online library of user-generated content has been individually showcased and praised by reviewers, and has been praised by Mario series co-creator Takashi Tezuka. He described Nintendo's overall restraint in the gameplay difficulty of its own content, in the interest of mass appeal. He expressed both appreciation and caution for the fact that the users do not necessarily share the same restraint in their creations.

The game would contribute to a resurgence in the Kaizo level designing community, which creates extremely difficult levels to test patience and skill.

Many players criticized Nintendo for removing their online courses without warning or explanation. Patrick Klepek of Kotaku wrote that Nintendo should have made sure anyone creating levels for the game was aware of the company's strict policies regarding level creation so they would know what Nintendo would not find acceptable.

Sales
Super Mario Maker debuted in Japan with more than 138,000 physical copies sold; it had sales of 245,000 copies in its first three weeks, by the end of September 2015. It was the second best-selling game in the UK in its first week of release, debuting at No. 2 on the UK software retail chart. It was the fourth fastest-selling game for the Wii U since the console's debut in 2012. In its first three weeks on sale in North America, 445,000 copies had been sold, with over 500,000 sold by the end of September 2015. Sales in the United States reached 1 million in mid-January 2016, making it the sixth Wii U game to do so in the country. By March 2021, 4.02 million copies had been sold worldwide. The Nintendo 3DS version had 162,180 copies sold within its first week of release in Japan. As of December 23, 2016, the Nintendo 3DS version had 448,160 copies sold in the region. As of December 31, 2016, 2 million copies had been sold for 3DS. By the end of March 2017, total 3DS sales reached 2.34 million.

In May 2016, Nintendo announced that more than 7.2 million courses had been created worldwide, which had been played more than 600 million times.

Awards

See also
 
 Mario Paint, 1992's inspiration for Super Mario Maker
 Mario Artist, 1999's sequel to Mario Paint with online publishing

Notes

References

External links
 

Mario video games
 
2015 video games
Nintendo 3DS eShop games
Nintendo 3DS games
Nintendo Network games
Retro-style video games
Side-scrolling video games
Single-player video games
Video games about size change
Video game development software
Video game level editors
Video games developed in Japan
Video games produced by Takashi Tezuka
Video games scored by Koji Kondo
Video games that use Amiibo figurines
Video games with 2.5D graphics
Video games with user-generated gameplay content
Products and services discontinued in 2021
Wii U eShop games
Wii U games
Pack-in video games
Video games scored by Naoto Kubo
The Game Awards winners
D.I.C.E. Award for Family Game of the Year winners